Werner Broll (born 22 May 1932) was a German politician of the Christian Democratic Union (CDU) and former member of the German Bundestag.

Life 
Broll studied history and German language and literature in Munich and Münster, graduating with the First State Examination in 1956 and the Second State Examination in 1958. He then worked as a secondary school teacher in the teaching profession, most recently as a senior student councilor. From 1968 to 1977 Broll was a member of the council of the city of Oldenburg and from 1970 to 1987 chairman of the district CDU association. He was also a board member of the CDU regional association. From 1976 to 1987 Broll was then a member of the German Bundestag. He was always elected via the state list in Lower Saxony. In the Bundestag, he was deputy chairman of the Committee for Electoral Examination, Immunity and Rules of Procedure from 1982 to 1984.

Literature

References

1932 births
Members of the Bundestag for Lower Saxony
Members of the Bundestag 1983–1987
Members of the Bundestag 1980–1983
Members of the Bundestag 1976–1980
Members of the Bundestag for the Christian Democratic Union of Germany
Living people